Robert McCusker (born 10 December 1985) is a Wales international rugby union player.

Club career
Born in Wrexham, McCusker began his rugby career playing for Mold RFC in WRU Division Four North, before being picked up by the Scarlets and Llanelli RFC. He made his debut for the Scarlets in a match against the Exeter Chiefs on 18 August 2007. He was made club captain by the Scarlets for the 2012–13 season. Despite primarily being a flanker, McCusker often played at number 8 for the Scarlets.

McCusker left the Scarlets at the start of the 2015–16, moving to London Irish, signing a one-year contract.

International career
McCusker has also played for the Welsh under-20 side, as well as the Welsh Sevens team, making appearances in the Hong Kong, England and Scotland legs of the 2006–07 IRB World Sevens Series, and the Dubai and George, South Africa legs of the 2007–08 Series.

McCusker was initially named by Wales coach Warren Gatland on a 50-man list of potential 2011 World Cup players. He was named in the Wales squad to play against South Africa, New Zealand and Australia in Summer 2010 after being promoted from the standby list due to injury to Andy Powell. He made his debut for Wales against South Africa on 5 June 2010 as a second-half replacement.

On 26 June 2010, McCusker impressed after replacing number eight and Wales captain Ryan Jones in the 25th minute of the second Test in Hamilton against the All-Blacks. Good form during the first part of the following season meant he kept his place in the Wales squad for the autumn internationals that year.

References

External links
Rob McCusker profile Welsh Rugby Union
Rob McCusker profile The Scarlets

1985 births
Living people
Welsh rugby union players
Wales international rugby union players
Rugby union flankers
Scarlets players
Rugby union players from Wrexham
Ospreys (rugby union) players
London Irish players